Beatrice d'Este (alternately Beatrix d'Este; 1475–1497) was the daughter of Ercole I d'Este and Duchess of Milan. 

Beatrice d'Este may also refer to:

Beatrice d'Este (died 1226), beatified in the Roman Catholic Church, the daughter of Azzo VI d'Este
Beatrice d'Este (died 1262), saint of the Roman Catholic Church, the daughter of Azzo VII d'Este
Beatrice d'Este (1215–1245), Queen of Hungary, the daughter of Aldobrandino I d'Este
Beatrice d'Este (1268–1334), mentioned in Dante’s Purgatorio
Maria Beatrice d'Este, Duchess of Massa (1750–1829)